Traverse City Central High School (also known as Central High School, TC Central, or simply TCC) is a public high school in Traverse City, Michigan. It is one of two comprehensive high schools in the Traverse City Area Public Schools district. It is the second-largest high school in Northern Michigan, behind rival Traverse City West Senior High School.

History 
The first public school in Traverse City opened in 1853. In 1877, it was moved to a new building called the Central School, built at Seventh and Pine Streets, which was rebuilt as a brick building in 1886. In 1934, the Central school building burned down, and students were relocated to the nearby Perry Hannah House while the school was being rebuilt.

In 1959, grades 10 through 12 moved into a new building called Traverse City Senior High School at its present-day location, on grounds formerly owned by the Northwestern Michigan College.

In 1978, 1985 and 1988, the Trojans of Traverse City Senior High School won the MHSAA Class A football championships.

In 1997, because of overcrowding at the school, which had become one of the largest high schools in Michigan, a second high school was built, and opened in early 1998. The new high school became Traverse City West Senior High School, and the existing one was renamed to Traverse City Central High School.

From 1997 to 2022, Traverse City Central's athletic programs were part of the Big North Conference, which was founded as a collection of Northern Michigan's largest public high schools after Traverse City's school split. However, in 2021, both Central and rival West made the decision to move football programs to the Saginaw Valley League in 2022, but remain in the Big North for all other offered sports.

Demographics 
The demographic breakdown of the 1,449 students enrolled in 2021-22 was:

 Female – 49.9%
 Male – 50.1%
 American Indian/Alaska Native – 1.4%
 Asian – 1.5%
 Black – 1.4%
 Hispanic – 4.4%
 Native Hawaiian/Pacific Islander – 0.2%
 White – 87.4%
 Two or more races –  3.6%

Additionally, 373 students (25.7%) were eligible for reduced-price or free lunch.

Athletics 
Traverse City Central's sports teams are known as the Trojans. The school is part of the Big North Conference and is considered a Class A school by MHSAA.

In 1978, 1985 and 1988, the Trojans of Traverse City Senior High School won the MHSAA Class A football championships. In 2021, the Trojans made it to the MHSAA Division 2 Championship round at Ford Field, but ultimately lost to the Warren De La Salle Pilots.

Rivalries 
Traverse City Central has had an intense crosstown rivalry with the Traverse City West Titans since 1997. Prior to then, the Traverse City Trojans had an intense rivalry with the Alpena Wildcats.

Notable alumni 
Mark Brammer, former NFL tight end
Demas T. Craw, United States Army Air Force officer
Eric Daigh, artist
Kevin Elsenheimer, judge and politician
Alden G. Glauch, former major general of the United States Air Force
Tom Kozelko, former NBA player
Dan Majerle, former all-star NBA player
William Milliken, former Governor of Michigan
Suzy Merchant, MSU Girls Basketball Coach
Andy Pascoe, baseball player and coach
Thomas G. Power, judge
Autumn Rademacher, assistant basketball coach at University of Nebraska Omaha
Zach Redmond, Colorado Avalanche Defenseman 
Alma Routsong, lesbian fiction novelist
Scott Schwenter, professor of Hispanic linguistics at Ohio State University
Harold Sherman, author
Ezra Winter, muralist

References

External links
Central High School Website*

Traverse City, Michigan
Public high schools in Michigan
Educational institutions established in 1853
Schools in Grand Traverse County, Michigan
1853 establishments in Michigan
School buildings completed in 1960
Traverse City Central-Traverse City West Rivalry